The La Manada sex abuse case of Pozoblanco is the legal process pursued against a group of men from Seville for their alleged sexual aggression of a 21-year-old girl in Pozoblanco, southern Spain, on 1 May 2016. The case arose following the discovery of footage in a phone belonging to one of the alleged aggressors showing an unresponsive girl lying in a van being subjected to groping and mockery. The victim, who has little memory of the elapsed time, let a friend know that "something had happened" to her, but knew of the sex abuses she suffered only after officers from the regional police of Navarre showed her the evidence, deciding in turn to report. On 4 June 2020, the perpetrators Alfonso Jesús Cabezuelo, Jesús Escudero and Antonio Manuel Guerrero were found guilty of sex abuse and offense against intimacy, and condemned to prison terms of two years and ten months each, with José Angel Prenda being convicted also of diffusing the images on Whatsapp with a prison term of four years and six months.

The case received media attention due to the fact that the defendants were the same aggressors of the La Manada gang rape which took place in Pamplona, Navarre, against a 18-year-old girl from Madrid two months later in July 2016, for which they were convicted and imprisoned. The hearings commenced in November 2019. The prosecutor petitioned a three-year prison term each for sex abuse, and four years more for offence to privacy, for recording and posting the footage. Alfonso Jesús Cabezuelo, a military officer at the time of the events, was requested an additional 12 euros fine per day over two months for injuring the girl with a smack.

She remembers getting into the van with the military officer and later waking up naked on the rear seat. He allegedly asked the girl to give oral sex, which she refused, for which he slapped her and hit her on the arm, let her out in the street on her own, insulting her, as she reported. The following day she took pictures of her leg with bruises on it to keep as evidence. She thinks she may have been drugged, which is consistent with comments shared by the defendants on Whatsapp, citing "burudanga", used to spike drinks.

On 4 June 2020, the jurisdictional tribunal of Cordova issued the sentence, convicting Alfonso Jesús Cabezuelo, Jesús Escudero and Antonio Manuel Guerrero of sexual abuse and offense against intimacy, with prison terms of two years and ten months each. José Angel Prenda received a higher prison term of four years and six months for also diffusing the images recorded on two Whatsapp groups. The group against gender violence in Cordova immediately reacted to the sentences, labelling them 'disgraceful' and calling a public meeting to show their rejection of the sentence.

References

See also
 Murder of Marta del Castillo

2016 in Spain
Sexual abuse
Violence against women in Spain
Trials in Spain